Mahabharatham is an Indian Tamil-language mythological television series that aired every Sunday on Sun TV from 17 February 2013 to 29 May 2016 at 10:00 AM IST for 166 episodes. The show is based on Mahabharat, a great epic told by sage and seer Veda Vyasa Maharshi and supposed to be written by Lord Vinayaka Bhagavan on sage Vyasa's instruction for the bounty of human race thousands of years ago.

The show starred Poovilangu Mohan, Saakshi Siva, Amit Bhargav, Neelima Rani, Ilavarasan, Nisha Krishnan and among others. It was produced by Cinevistaas Limited and director by C.V. Sasikumar, Raja and Suresh Krissna. The epic television series has more than 400 artists cast in various roles.
Mahabharatham is currently retelecasting in Colors Tamil from 19 February 2023 Sunday 10:00AM.

Cast
 Amit Bhargav / Vallab as Lord Krishna / Lord Vishnu
 Neelima Rani as Rukmini / Goddess Padmavati
 Ramya Ramakrishnan as Goddess Mahalakshmi
 Poovilangu Mohan as Vyasa
 Bharat Kalyan as Vasudeva
 Pavitra Lokesh as Devaki
 Pasanga Sivakumar as Nanda Baba
 Durga / Yuva Sri as Yashoda
 Ilavarasan as Shantanu
 Rashmi as Ganga
 O.A.K. Sundar as Bhishma 
 Devipriya as Satyavati
 Pooja Lokesh as Amba / Shikandi
 Archana Gaikwad as Ambika  
 Roopika as Ambalika
 Narasimha Raju as Dhritarashtra
 Pavithra Janani  as Gandhari
 Bose Venkat as Pandu
 Dipika Gunasegar as Kunti
 Saakshi Siva as Vidura 
 Bharathkumar as Parashurama
 Vetri Vel as Duryodhan
 Manohar as Karna/Janamejaya 
 Sathya as Arjuna 
 Aishwarya Prabhakar / Nisha Ganesh as Draupadi/Panchali
 Ramesh Pandit as Shakuni
 Gururaj as Vashistha 
 Shamily Sukumar as Subhadra
 Bhavya Kala as Sulabha
 Sharanya Turadi as Paali
 Kavitha Gowda as Shubhangi
 Sajan Prasad as teen Krishna
 Minnal Deepa as Rohini Devi

Episodes

References

External links
 Official Website 
 IMDB link 

Sun TV original programming
Tamil-language mythology soap operas
2013 Tamil-language television series debuts
Tamil-language television shows
Television shows based on poems
2016 Tamil-language television series endings
Television series based on Mahabharata